Snow-on-the-mountain may refer to:

Euphorbia marginata, a plant of the genus Euphorbia that is native to the United States
Camellia sasanqua 'Mine-no-Yuki', a cultivar of the shrub Camellia sasanqua
Aegopodium podagraria